was a Nippon Professional Baseball pitcher.

1919 births
1985 deaths
Baseball people from Gifu Prefecture
Mainichi Orions players
Takahashi Unions players
Japanese baseball players
Nippon Professional Baseball pitchers